The Kingmaker is the name of three fictional supervillains appearing in American comic books published by Marvel Comics.

Publication history
The first iteration debuted in New X-Men: Hellions #1 (July 2005), and was created by Nunzio DeFilippis, Christina Weir and Clayton Henry.

The second iteration debuted in Dark Reign: Hawkeye #5 (September 2009), and was created by Andy Diggle and Tom Raney.

The third iteration debuted in Osborn #1 (January 2011), and was created by Kelly Sue DeConnick and Emma Rios.

Fictional character biography

Wallace

The first version is a powerful, but largely unknown villain known as Wallace. Though it isn't apparent whether or not the Kingmaker has any superhuman powers of his own, his personal fortune and resources have allied him with various figures of the supervillain underworld. In essence, the Kingmaker is a high-stakes loan shark, but one who deals in favours rather than money. His standard agreement involves delivering any one wish to an applicant in exchange for a favour to be named later. His network of favours have given him vast financial reserves, business agreements with powerful individuals, and a personal trove of high-tech weaponry for his personal defence. He may even have some magical strength to draw upon. He has a history with Emma Frost as a result of rejection of his bid for membership in the Hellfire Club.

When New X-Men member Hellion was denied a family inheritance, Hellion investigated their financial history, eventually discovering their involvement with the Kingmaker. Conducting a peculiar ritual, Hellion and his team-mates were contacted by the Kingmaker who offered his standard contract. In exchange for their deepest wishes, the kids were tasked with stealing a device for their benefactor. Unbeknownst to the Hellions, the device was a biological weapon that the Kingmaker was retrieving for none other than Doctor Octopus. The kids managed to retrieve the device, but after a briefing with Nick Fury, the Hellions turned on the Kingmaker. After several losing battles, the Hellions finally managed to defeat the villain who was then arrested. He was later released by Emma who convinced him to leave Frost's students alone under threat of using mental powers to get him sent back to jail.

Bullseye's Father

The second version is the father of Bullseye and appeared during the Dark Reign storyline. When Bullseye was fighting an army of Hawkeyes and took them out except for one, he was captured by Solo and brought before the Kingmaker. The Kingmaker prepares to trade his old burned husk of a body for Bullseye's by placing his brain in his son's body. Unfortunately, nobody told him that Bullseye's bones are laced with adamantium which not only is impossible to cut, but also blocks Kingmaker's neural inhibitor.

Bullseye fights his way through Solo in order to get to his dad. After Bullseye successfully kills the Kingmaker, Ben Urich is frightened from filing a story on the Kingmaker.

Pryor Cashman

The third version is Pryor Cashman. He is described as a "demon entity" who psychically "feeds" off the memory of any humans. He is additionally able to see and alter the memories of others, and has used this ability in the past to create dictators. At some point, he was captured by government officials and incarcerated in a secret location several miles underwater.

When Norman Osborn himself was jailed in the facility after being transferred from the Raft, the Kingmaker was among the inmates who staged a break-out following a prison riot alongside Osborn, June Covington, Ai Apaec, and Carny Rives.

Making their way to an escape pod, Osborn and the rest of the inmates were able to go free. The Kingmaker was last seen on a beach surrounded by children.

Powers and abilities
Wallace had a personal force field and his sunglasses have ruby optic blasts similar to Cyclops's optic blasts.

Pryor Cashman can manipulate memories.

References

External links
 Kingmaker I at Marvel Wiki
 Kingmaker II at Marvel Wiki
 Kingmaker III at Marvel Wiki

Articles about multiple fictional characters
Comics characters introduced in 2005
Comics characters introduced in 2009
Comics characters introduced in 2011
Fictional businesspeople
Marvel Comics supervillains
Characters created by Clayton Henry
Characters created by Nunzio DeFilippis
Characters created by Christina Weir